Myanmar Distribution Group, established in 1996, is a fast moving consumer goods distributor in Myanmar.

Retail companies of Myanmar
Retail companies established in 1996
1996 establishments in Myanmar